Thomas Hicks (October 18, 1823 – October 8, 1890) was an American painter.

Biography
Hicks was born in Newtown, Bucks County, Pennsylvania and became a portrait painter, but is also known for genre works. He is known for his portrait of Abraham Lincoln that was engraved by Leopold Grozelier. Charles Henry Yewell studied with him for a time.

After his death on October 8, 1890, he was interred at Green-Wood Cemetery in Brooklyn, New York.

References

Thomas Hicks on Artnet

1823 births
1890 deaths
19th-century American painters
American male painters
People from Bucks County, Pennsylvania
Painters from Pennsylvania
Burials at Green-Wood Cemetery
19th-century American male artists